The 2002 All Japan Grand Touring Car Championship was the tenth season of Japan Automobile Federation GT premiere racing. It was marked as well as the twentieth season of a JAF-sanctioned sports car racing championship dating back to the All Japan Sports Prototype Championship. The GT500 class drivers' champions of 2002 were Juichi Wakisaka and Akira Iida driving the No. 6 Esso Team LeMans Toyota Supra, and the teams' champion was Honda team Mugen x Dome Project with their No. 16 Mugen NSX and No. 18 Takata Dome NSX. The GT300 class drivers' champions were the No. 31 ARTA with A'PEX Toyota MR-S driven by Morio Nitta and Shinichi Takagi.

Drivers and teams

GT500

Schedule

Season results

Standings

GT500 class

Drivers' standings
Scoring system

Teams' standings
For teams that entered multiple cars, only the best result from each round counted towards the teams' championship.

GT300 class (Top 5)

Drivers

References

External links
 Super GT/JGTC official race archive 
 2002 season results

Super GT seasons
JGTC